Lee Erwin (September 12, 1906, in Ada, Oklahoma - June 4, 1972 in Los Angeles, California) was a television writer from the 1950s to the 1970s. Erwin wrote for Mr. & Mrs. North, The Millionaire, Have Gun, Will Travel, The New Adventures of Charlie Chan and many other 1950s and 1960s TV shows.  He is probably best known for his Star Trek episode "Whom Gods Destroy", his two-part Tarzan episode "The Deadly Silence", and his episode of The Lieutenant, "To Set It Right", which was never aired because the subject matter, racial prejudice, was taboo for entertainment television at the time. This episode can be viewed at The Paley Center for Media. His last work for television was the script for the All in the Family episode "Writing the President" (1971).

Filmography

Films

Television

References

External links
 

1906 births
1972 deaths
People from Ada, Oklahoma
American television writers
American male screenwriters
American male television writers
Screenwriters from Oklahoma
20th-century American male writers
20th-century American screenwriters